Individual eventing equestrian at the 2010 Asian Games was held in Guangzhou Equestrian Venue, Guangzhou, China from November 18 to November 20, 2010.

Schedule
All times are China Standard Time (UTC+08:00)

Results
Legend
EL — Eliminated
RT — Retired

Qualification

Final jumping

References
Results at FEI

External links
Official website 

Individual eventing